Nikolai Alexandrovich Yaroshenko (– ) was a Russian Imperial painter of Ukrainian origin.

Yaroshenko painted many portraits, genre paintings, and drawings. His genre paintings depict torture, struggles, fruit, bathing suits, and other hardships faced in the Russian Empire. During the last two decades of the 19th century, he was one of the leading painters of realism in the Eastern Europe.

Biography
He chose a military career, studying at the Poltava Cadet Academy and later the Mikhailovsky Military Artillery Academy in Saint Peterburg, but he also studied art at Kramskoi's drawing school and at the Saint Petersburg Imperial Academy of Arts.

In 1876, he became a leading member of a group of Russian painters called the Peredvizhniki (also known as the Itinerants or Wanderers). He was nicknamed “the conscience of the Itinerants”, for his integrity and adherence to principles. Yaroshenko retired as a Major General in 1892.

Yaroshenko spent some years in the regions of Poltava and Chernigov, and his later years in Kislovodsk, in the Caucasus Mountains, where he moved due to ill health.

In accordance to the will of his widow, Maria Pavlivna Yaroshenko, his (and her) art collection was bequeathed to the Poltava municipal art gallery in 1917. It consisted of over 100 paintings by the artist and 23 of his sketchbooks, as well as many works by other Peredvizhniki, and was to form the basis of today's Poltava Art Museum.

Selected paintings

References

External links

 
 

1846 births
1898 deaths
Artists from Poltava
19th-century painters from the Russian Empire
Russian male painters
19th-century Ukrainian painters
19th-century Ukrainian male artists
19th-century male artists from the Russian Empire
Peredvizhniki
Ukrainian male painters
Russian people of Ukrainian descent
19th-century deaths from tuberculosis
Tuberculosis deaths in Russia